Vladimir Vasilyevich Gostyukhin (born 10 March 1946) is a Soviet and Russian, Belarusian film and stage actor.

Selected filmography

Actor 
 1977: The Ascent as Rybak
 1980: The White Crow
 1980: Fox Hunting as Belov
 1983: Moon Rainbow as David Norton
 1986: Zina-Zinulya as Viktor Nikolaevich
 1986: In Search for Captain Grant as Major McNabbs
 1987: Moonzund as Semenchuk
 1989: Abduction of the Wizard as Akiplesha
 1991: Close to Eden as Sergey
 1992: The General as  Alexander Gorbatov
 2002: War as Ivan's father
 2013: Ottepel as Pronin
 2016: Santa Claus. Battle of the Magi as Vitaly Semyonovich

Director 
 1997: Botanichesky Sad

Political views 
One of the founders of the Belarusian Republican Party of Labour and Justice.

References

External links 

1946 births
Living people
Actors from Yekaterinburg
Republican Party of Labour and Justice politicians
Soviet male actors
Russian male film actors
Belarusian male film actors
Russian male stage actors
Belarusian male stage actors
20th-century Russian male actors
20th-century Belarusian male actors
21st-century Russian male actors
Russian Academy of Theatre Arts alumni
Recipients of the Order of Francysk Skaryna
Recipients of the Medal of Pushkin
Recipients of the USSR State Prize
Recipients of the Byelorussian SSR State Prize
State Prize of the Russian Federation laureates